The Cuba men's national under-19 volleyball team represents Cuba in international men's volleyball competitions and friendly matches under the age 19 and it is ruled by the Cuban Volleyball Federation body That is an affiliate of the International Volleyball Federation FIVB and also a part of the North, Central America and Caribbean Volleyball Confederation NORCECA.

Results

Summer Youth Olympics
 Champions   Runners up   Third place   Fourth place

FIVB U19 World Championship
 Champions   Runners up   Third place   Fourth place

NORCECA Boys U19 Championship
 Champions   Runners up   Third place   Fourth place

Team

Current squad

The following is the Cuban roster in the 2015 FIVB Volleyball Boys' U19 World Championship.

Head Coach: Jesús Cruz Lopez

Notable players

References

External links
FIVB profile

National men's under-19 volleyball teams
Volleyball
Volleyball in Cuba
Volleyball